The 2021–22 Taça da Liga was the fifteenth edition of the Taça da Liga (also known as Allianz Cup for sponsorship reasons), a football league cup competition organised by the Liga Portuguesa de Futebol Profissional and contested exclusively by clubs competing in the top two professional tiers of Portuguese football – the Primeira Liga and the LigaPro. It began on 26 July 2021 and concluded with the final in Leiria on 29 January 2022.

Sporting CP were the holders and three-time winners, after beating Braga 1–0 in the 2021 final, and they won their fourth title after defeating Benfica 2–1 in the 2022 final.

Format
Twenty-eight teams consisting in all teams from Primeira and Segunda Liga with exception of the top 6 teams in 2020–21 Primeira Liga take part in the first round; one-legged ties with no extra-time were played between Twenty-eight teams.

In the second round, the fourteen teams advancing from the previous round are joined by the teams placed 5th and 6th in the 2020–21 Primeira Liga. Again, one-legged ties with no extra-time were played between sixteen teams.

The third round features the eight teams advancing from the previous round and the four best-placed teams in the 2020–21 Primeira Liga. The twelve teams will drawn into four groups that are contested in a single round-robin schedule, with each team playing one game at home and one game on the opposition's home.

The four group winners qualify for the knockout phase, which features single-legged ties, again with no extra-time being played. The semi-finals and final are played at a neutral venue, set to be in Leiria in January 2022.

Tiebreakers
In the third round, teams are ranked according to points (3 points for a win, 1 point for a draw, 0 points for a loss). If two or more teams are tied on points on completion of the group matches, the following criteria are applied to determine the rankings:
highest goal difference in all group matches;
highest number of scored goals in all group matches;
lowest average age of all players fielded in all group matches (sum of the ages of all fielded players divided by the number of fielded players).

In all other rounds, teams tied at the end of regular time contest a penalty shootout to determine the winner. No extra-time is played.

Teams
Thirty-four teams competing in the two professional tiers of Portuguese football for the 2021–22 season are eligible to participate in this competition. For teams that were either promoted or related, the final position in the previous league season determines in which round they enter the competition.

Key
Nth: League position in the 2020–21 season
P1: Promoted to the Primeira Liga
R1: Relegated to the Liga Portugal 2
P2: Promoted to the Liga Portugal 2

Schedule

First round
Twenty-eight teams consisting in all teams from Primeira and Segunda Liga with exception of the top 6 teams in 2020–21 Primeira Liga take part in the first round. Twenty-eight teams were paired against each other for fourteen single-legged ties. The draw took place on 8 July 2021, and the matches were played on 23 and 26 July 2021. Games tied at the end of regular time were decided by a penalty shootout with no extra-time being played. The first team drawn in each fixture played at home.

Notes:

Second round
In the second round, the fourteen first-round winners joined the two teams ranked 5th and 6th in the 2021–22 Primeira Liga. Sixteen teams were paired against each other for twelve single-legged ties. The draw took place on 8 July 2021, and the matches were played on 30 July and 1 August 2021. Games tied at the end of regular time were decided by a penalty shootout with no extra-time being played. The first team drawn in each fixture played at home.

Third round
In the third round, the eight second-round winners will join the four top-ranked teams from the 2020–21 Primeira Liga: Sporting CP (1st), Porto (2nd), Benfica (3rd) and Braga (4th). These twelve teams will be drawn into four groups of three, each group containing one of the four top-ranked Primeira Liga teams. Group matches will be played in a single round-robin schedule, ensuring that each team played at least one match at home.

Group A

Group B

Group C

Group D

Knockout phase
The knockout phase was contested as a final-four tournament by the four third-round group winners in one-legged semi-finals and final. All matches were played in a single venue, decided before the competition starts. As in the first and second round, games tied at the end of regular time were decided by a penalty shootout with no extra-time being played.

All matches were played at Estádio Municipal de Leiria, in Leiria, with the semi-finals scheduled to be played on 25–26 January, and the final on 29 January 2022.

Semi-finals

Final

References

External links
 Liga Portugal official website

Taça da Liga
Taca da Liga
Portugal